Hemiasterella is a genus of sponges belonging to the family Hemiasterellidae.

The genus has almost cosmopolitan distribution.

Species:

Hemiasterella affinis 
Hemiasterella ajax 
Hemiasterella aristoteliana 
Hemiasterella bouilloni 
Hemiasterella callocyathus 
Hemiasterella complicata 
Hemiasterella digitata 
Hemiasterella elongata 
Hemiasterella intermedia 
Hemiasterella magna 
Hemiasterella strongylophora 
Hemiasterella topsenti 
Hemiasterella typus 
Hemiasterella vasiformis 
Hemiasterella verae

References

Sponges